The 1961 European Amateur Team Championship took place 20 – 25 July on the Royal Golf Club de Belgique in Brussels, Belgium. It was the second men's golf European Amateur Team Championship.

Format 
All participating teams played two qualification rounds of stroke-play, counting the four best scores out of up to six players for each team. The four best teams formed flight A. The next three teams formed flight B and the next three teams formed flight C.

The standings in each flight was determined by a round-robin system. All teams in the flight met each other and the team with most points for team matches in flight A won the tournament, using the scale, win=2 points, halved=1 point, lose=0 points. In each match between two nation teams, three foursome games and six single games were played.

Teams 
Ten nation teams contested the event. Each team consisted of a minimum of six players. England took part for the first time.

Players in the leading teams

Other participating teams

Winners 
Defending champion team Sweden won the gold medal, earning 5 points in flight A. Team England, on their first appearance in the championship, took the silver medal on 4 points and France earned, just as in the inaugural edition two years before, the bronze on third place.

On the last day of the tournament, Sweden and England met in the deciding match, where a tie was enough to give Sweden the championship. In the game between Bengt Möller, Sweden, and Keith Warren, England, Möller made a 14-meter putt on the 18th green, to tie the hole, win his game by one hole and secure a tie of the team match and the championship for Sweden, despite another two ongoing games.

Individual winner in the opening 36-hole stroke-play qualifying competition was  Gaëtan Mourgue D'Algue, France, with a score of 3-under-par 143. Gustaf Adolf Bielke, Sweden, shot a new course record in the second round, with a score of 69 over 18 holes at the Belgique course.

Results 
Qualification rounds

Team standings

Individual leader

 Note: There was no official recognition for the lowest individual score.

Flight A

Team matches

Team standings

Flight B

Team standings

Flight C

Team standings

Final standings

Sources:

See also 

 Eisenhower Trophy – biennial world amateur team golf championship for men organized by the International Golf Federation.
 European Ladies' Team Championship – European amateur team golf championship for women organised by the European Golf Association.

References

External links 
European Golf Association: Full results

European Amateur Team Championship
Golf tournaments in Belgium
European Amateur Team Championship
European Amateur Team Championship
European Amateur Team Championship